Isaac Adler (1849–1918) was an American physician known for his published descriptions of lung cancer cases in the early 20th century.

Early life
Isaac Adler was born in Alzey, Germany in 1849 to Henriette Frankfurter and noted rabbi Samuel Adler. In 1857, the family emigrated to the United States. Adler received an undergraduate degree from Columbia College in 1868, then his M.D. in Heidelberg, Germany in 1871.

Medical career
Beginning in 1875, Adler worked as a physician at German Hospital (now Lenox Hill Hospital) in New York City. In 1892, Adler was appointed professor of clinical pathology at the New York Polyclinic Medical School. In 1898, he was elected consulting physician at Montefiore Home. 

In 1912, Adler published the work for which he is best known, "Primary Malignant Growths of the Lungs and Bronchi". In the first review of lung cancer, previously a rare disease, Adler listed 374 known cases from various European registries. Adler noted "a decided increase" in lung cancer, and speculated that tobacco or alcohol could be involved. Adler suggested that lung cancer was frequently misdiagnosed as tuberculosis.

Personal life
Adler married Frida Grumbacher on May 24th, 1874. Adler died at his New York City home on May 4th, 1918.

References

American physicians
1849 births
1918 deaths